Katharina Gierok (born 20 February 1992 in Krefeld, Germany) is a German pair skater. With former partner Florian Just, she is the 2011 German national bronze medalist. She previously competed in single skating and is the 2006–2007 German Junior national bronze medalist.

Career 
Gierok initially competed as a single skater. She made her senior debut during the 2007-2008 season, winning the 2008 NRW Trophy in Dortmund, Germany and placing 10th at the German Figure Skating Championships. After winning the third and final Junior Worlds Qualifier in Oberstdorf and being nominated as first alternate for the 2008 World Junior Figure Skating Championships, she had to end the season to undergo knee surgery. The German Skating Federation admitted Gierok to the German Junior Team for the season 2008 / 2009. This was the third season she was part of the DC Team envelope.

In spring 2010, she switched to pair skating, partnering with Florian Just. Karel Fajfr coaches the pair. They won silver at NRW Trophy and bronze at Warsaw Cup. At 2011 German Nationals, they won the bronze medal and were selected to compete at the European Championships. They finished 11th in their debut at the event, with a combined total of 118.06 points. Gierok and Just ended their partnership at the end of the 2011-12 season.

Programs 
With Just

Competitive highlights

Pairs career with Just

Singles career

References

External links 

 
 
 Katharina Gierok at Tracings.net

1992 births
Living people
German female single skaters
German female pair skaters
Sportspeople from Krefeld